Aram Zaveni Sargsyan (2 January 1961) is an Armenian political figure. He was Prime Minister of Armenia from 3 November 1999 to 2 May 2000.

He is the younger brother of Vazgen Sargsyan. In 2001, he founded the Hanrapetutyun Party. He supported the opposition leader Levon Ter-Petrosyan in the 2008 Armenian presidential election.

Sargsyan was elected to the Armenian National Assembly in May 2012 with the Armenian National Congress, but he didn't accept the seat.

In the 2017 Armenian parliamentary election, Sargsyan was elected through the proportional list of the Way Out Alliance.

Prior to the 2018 Yerevan City Council election, Sargsyan co-led the Bright Alliance.

Sargsyan led the Hanrapetutyun Party as its candidate for Prime Minister in the 2021 Armenian parliamentary election. The party received 3.04% of the vote, coming in fifth place.

References

Prime Ministers of Armenia
Living people
1961 births
People from Ararat, Armenia
Hanrapetutyun Party politicians